The Women's 5 km competition at the 2022 World Aquatics Championships was held on 27 June 2022.

Results
The race was started at 12:00.

References

Women's 5 km
Women's 5 km open water